The Giyasly Mosque is a mosque located in the village of Qiyaslı, Agdam, Azerbaijan. By the order of the Cabinet of Ministers of the Republic of Azerbaijan dated with 2 August 2001, the mosque was taken under state protection as an architectural monument of local importance (No. 4052).

History 
The mosque was built in the 18th century. In the early 1990s, during the Karabakh war, the village of Giyasly was occupied by the Armenian armed forces. Under the terms of the hostilities cessation statement, that took place on 20 November 2020, the village of Giyasly, as part of the Aghdam region, was returned to Azerbaijan.

The Kommersant correspondent Kirill Krivosheev, who also visited the village, noted that there were piles of hay in the village mosque, and a corral was made nearby.

Gallery

See also 
 Agdam Mosque
 Garghabazar Mosque
 Yukhari Govhar Agha Mosque

References

External links 
 Erməni vandalizminə məruz qalan tarixi-dini abidələrimiz: Qiyaslı məscidi / AZERTAG

Architecture in Azerbaijan
18th-century mosques
Buildings and structures in Aghdam